Parker Metal Decoration Company Plant is a historic factory building located at Baltimore, Maryland, United States. It is a steel-frame brick industrial building, ranging from one to three stories in height, and consists of five components built in stages between the first decade of the 20th century and the 1940s. The Parker Metal Decorating Company operated between 1921 and 1994.

Parker Metal Decoration Company Plant was listed on the National Register of Historic Places in 2000.

References

External links
, including photo from 2000, at Maryland Historical Trust

Buildings and structures in Baltimore
Industrial buildings and structures on the National Register of Historic Places in Baltimore
Industrial buildings completed in 1921
South Baltimore